Ermal is an Albanian masculine given name, which means wind of the mountain. People named Ermal include:

Ermal Bojdani (born 1985), Albanian-American physician, emergency and public psychiatrist, scientist, teacher of clinical medicine 
Ermal Allen (1918–1988), American football quarterback and assistant coach
Ermal Fejzullahu (born 1988) Kosovar singer
  Ermal Peçi (born 1988), Albanian Tv Host
Ermal Fraze (born 1913), American inventor
Ermal Kuqo (born 1980), Albanian basketball player
Ermal Mamaqi (born 1982), Albanian actor, singer, comedian and DJ
Ermal Meta (born 1981), Albanian-Italian singer and songwriter
Ermal Sako (born 1989), Albanian footballer
Ermal Tahiri (born 1969), Albanian footballer

Albanian masculine given names